Louis Thiétard (31 May 1910 – 21 January 1998) was a French cyclist. He rode in the 1947, 1948 and 1949 Tour de France. He also finished third in the 1943 Paris–Roubaix, the 1944 Paris–Roubaix and the 1947 Paris–Roubaix.

References

External links

1910 births
1998 deaths
French male cyclists
French Vuelta a España stage winners
Sportspeople from Nord (French department)
Tour de Suisse stage winners
Cyclists from Hauts-de-France